The 1991 European Ladies' Team Championship took place 10–14 July at Wentworth Club in Virginia Water, Surrey, England, United Kingdom. It was the 17th women's golf amateur European Ladies' Team Championship.

Venue 

The hosting Wentworth Club was founded in 1922. Its West Course, situated in Virginia Water, Surrey, 40 kilometres south-west of the city center of London, England, not far from Windsor Castle, opened in 1926 and was designed by golf course architect Harry Colt. It had previously hosted some of the most prestigious tournaments in the world,  the 1953 Ryder Cup, the 1956 Canada Cup and several editions of the World Match Play Championship and the BMW PGA Championship.

The championship course was set up with par 75.

Format 
All participating teams played two qualification rounds of stroke-play with six players, counted the five best scores for each team.

The eight best teams formed flight A, in knock-out match-play over the next three days. The teams were seeded based on their positions after the stroke-play. The first placed team was drawn to play the quarter final against the eight placed team, the second against the seventh, the third against the sixth and the fourth against the fifth. In each match between two nation teams, two 18-hole foursome games and five 18-hole single games were played. Teams were allowed to switch players during the team matches, selecting other players in to the afternoon single games after the morning foursome games. Games all square after 18 holes were declared halved, if the team match was already decided.

The five teams placed 9–13 in the qualification stroke-play formed Flight B, to meet each other to decide their final positions.

Teams 
13 nation teams contested the event. Each team consisted of six players.

Players in the leading teams

Other participating teams

Winners 
Two-times-champions team Sweden, with 20 years old future professional world number one Annika Sörenstam in the team, won the opening 36-hole qualifying competition, with a score of 18 over par 768, eight strokes ahead of host nation England. 

Individual leader in the 36-hole stroke-play competition was Silvia Cavalleri, Italy, with a score of 2-under-par 148, one stroke ahead of Joanne Morley, England.

Team England won the championship. Playing in their tenth final they beat Sweden 5–2 and earned their seventh title. Defending champions France earned third place, beating team Wales in the bronze match.

Results 
Qualification round

Team standings

Individual leaders

 Note: There was no official award for the lowest individual score.

Flight A

Bracket

Final games

Final standings

Sources:

See also 
 Espirito Santo Trophy – biennial world amateur team golf championship for women organized by the International Golf Federation.
 European Amateur Team Championship – European amateur team golf championship for men organised by the European Golf Association.

References

External links 
 European Golf Association: Results

European Ladies' Team Championship
Golf tournaments in England
Sport in Surrey
European Ladies' Team Championship
European Ladies' Team Championship
European Ladies' Team Championship